The Works Constitution Act 1972, abbreviated BetrVG, is a German federal law governing the right of employees to form a works council.

History 
In the Stinnes-Legien Abkommen 1918, at the collapse of the German Reich following World War One an agreement between trade union confederation leader Carl Legien and industrialist leader Hugo Stinnes, it was agreed that capital and labour would cooperate on an equal foot in all aspects of economic management. This was written into the Weimar Constitution, article 165. To implement this principle, in 1920 the legal predecessor Betriebsrätegesetz (Works Councils Act) mandated consultative bodies for workers in businesses with more than 20 employees. All voting rights and work councils for labour were, however, abolished by Hitler in 1933, and replaced with Nazi controlled management bodies. 

After World War Two and the defeat of fascism, work councils were revived by collective agreements promoted under Control Council Law No.22 (Kontrollratsgesetz No. 22) in 1946. This enabled unions to create work councils with binding rights in management, as well as collectively bargain. Subsequently, the agreements for work councils were codified in the Works Constitution Act, passed on 11 October 1952. Trade unions in Germany wanted much more. In 1972 the Betriebsverfassungsgesetz was updated and reissued, and forms the current basis of the law. In 2001 the Betriebsverfassungsgesetz strengthened the rights of workers marginally, and in 2021 the Betriebsrätemodernisierungsgesetz (Works Council Modernization Act) was planned to adjust co-determination over artificial intelligence in the workplace, allow digital meetings amongst other reforms.

See also 
German labour law
Codetermination Act 1976

References

External links 
Legal text by BMJV – German, English translation

German labour law
Works council